Preston Powers  (1843 – 1931) was an American sculptor, painter, and teacher, born in Florence, Italy. He is also known as William Preston Powers.

Biography
Powers studied with his father, Hiram Powers, a well known Neo-classical sculptor   and expatriate who lived in Italy.  After returning to the United States, the younger Powers worked as an artist in Boston Massachusetts, Washington D.C. and Portland Maine. Powers eventually became his father's personal secretary, a position he held until Hiram Powers' death in 1873. Preston sued his mother for inadequate support after the details of his father's will became known, as it declared his widow as sole heir. In order to keep peace within the family, Preston Powers was made the supervisor of Hiram Powers' studio-workshop, which eventually closed in 1877. He later operated his own studio across the street from his mother's house but insisted on harassing her with additional lawsuits. Preston Powers died penniless in Florence, Italy, and was buried in the pauper's section of the Allori Protestant Cemetery located outside the city.

Work
Powers' statue The Closing of an Era at the Colorado State Capitol in Denver depicts an American Indian in triumph over a fallen bison. The granite for the statue came from Fremont County, Colorado. The sculpture was completed for the Chicago World's Fair in 1893. Powers' friend John Greenleaf Whittier wrote the poem inscribed at the base of the monument.

Preston Powers sculpted several portrait busts; some of his most notable creations include:
 Lady Alexander Mackenzie of Scotland
 United States Senator Justin Smith Morrill of Vermont
 James Lawrence, Boston, Massachusetts
 Alvin Adams, founder of Adams Express Company
 John Greenleaf Whittier
 J. C. Whiting
 Senator Charles Sumner
 President Ulysses S. Grant
 Marshall Field and Son, Chicago, Illinois
 Mrs. Wheatland, Salem, Massachusetts
 Eugene Sargent, Boston
 Mrs. John E. Hatch, Cincinnati
 Senator Jacob Collamer of Vermont, installed in the United States Capitol, in Washington D.C., as part of the National Statuary Hall Collection.
 Bishop George Burgess, first Episcopal bishop of Maine
 Emanuel Swedenborg, for the New Church in England
 Reuben Springer, for the Music Hall in Cincinnati

He is best remembered for his portraits.  His students include Alice Cooper and Elsie Ward.

References

External links

1842 births
1904 deaths
19th-century American sculptors
19th-century American male artists
American male sculptors
Artists from Florence
Sculptors from Massachusetts
19th-century American painters
American male painters
20th-century American sculptors
20th-century American male artists
20th-century American painters